João Carlos Silva Reis (born 24 June 1992) is a Portuguese footballer who plays for Estrela da Amadora as a defender.

Football career
On 27 July 2013, Reis made his professional debut with Farense in a 2013–14 Taça da Liga match against Santa Clara, when he started and played the full game. In the first match of the  2013–14 Segunda Liga season against Portimonense on the 10 August, he made his league debut.

On 30 June 2021, he signed with Varzim.

References

External links

Stats and profile at LPFP

1992 births
People from Loulé
Living people
Portuguese footballers
Association football forwards
Primeira Liga players
Liga Portugal 2 players
Campeonato de Portugal (league) players
Louletano D.C. players
S.C. Farense players
G.D. Chaves players
C.D. Santa Clara players
C.D. Tondela players
Varzim S.C. players
Portugal under-21 international footballers
Sportspeople from Faro District